Air Vice Marshal Thomas Audley Langford-Sainsbury,  (23 November 1897 – 21 June 1972) was a senior Royal Air Force officer who commanded British Air Forces in Egypt during the Second World War.

RAF career
Educated at Radley College, Langford-Sainsbury was commissioned in to the Royal Flying Corps in 1916 during the First World War. He went on to command No. 38 Squadron from 1932 and No. 48 Squadron from 1936. Promoted to wing commander in 1937, he served in the Second World War on the Air Staff at Headquarters No. 16 (Reconnaissance) Group and then as Deputy Senior Air Staff Officer at RAF Coastal Command from 1941. He continued his war service as Air Officer Commanding No. 15 (General Reconnaissance) Group from 1942, Air Officer Commanding No. 201 (Naval Co-operation) Group from 1943 and Air Officer Commanding AHQ Eastern Mediterranean from 1944. He was made Air Officer Commanding AHQ Egypt in November 1944 and Senior Air Staff Officer at Headquarters RAF Bomber Command in May 1945.

After the war he served as Air Officer Administration at Headquarters British Air Forces of Occupation before retiring in 1949.

References

|-

1897 births
1972 deaths
British Army personnel of World War I
Companions of the Order of the Bath
Officers of the Order of the British Empire
Recipients of the Air Force Cross (United Kingdom)
Recipients of the Distinguished Flying Cross (United Kingdom)
Royal Air Force air marshals of World War II
Royal Flying Corps officers
British expatriates in Egypt